Elijah Brigham Bryant (born April 19, 1995) is an American professional basketball player for Anadolu Efes of the Turkish Basketball Super League (BSL) and the EuroLeague. He played college basketball for the Elon Phoenix and Brigham Young Cougars.

Early life and high school career
Born in Gwinnett County, Georgia, Bryant began playing basketball at a young age, always playing against older children. As a junior in high school, he had a growth spurt and grew one foot in a year. Bryant attended New Hampton School in New Hampton, New Hampshire, where he averaged 13 points, four rebounds and four assists per game and led the Huskies to the NEPSAC AAA final.

College career
Bryant started his college career with Elon University, where he averaged 14.2 points, 4.2 rebounds, 2.7 assists and 1.3 steals per game in his freshman year. Bryant was named Colonial Athletic Association Rookie of the Year and earned a spot in the Third-team All-CAA and CAA All-Rookie Team. On July 28, 2015, Bryant transferred from Elon to Brigham Young University (BYU), but sat out first season at BYU per NCAA transfer rules.

He posted 11.7 points, 3.6 rebounds and 2.2 assists per game as a sophomore. He only played 23 games due to the effects of a knee injury. Despite the injury, Bryant scored career-high 39 points, including seven 3-pointers in a win against Portland.

In his junior year at BYU, Bryant finished the season as the West Coast Conference second-leading scorer with 18.1 points per game, third in free-throw percentage (.850), third in 3-point field goal percentage (.415), fourth in steals (1.2), eighth in rebounds (6.3) and tied for seventh in double-doubles. On February 27, 2018, Bryant earned a spot in the First-team All-WCC. On April 18, 2018, after completing his junior year at BYU, Bryant announced his plans to graduate and forgo his remaining eligibility for a professional career.

Professional career

Hapoel Eilat (2018–2019)
After going undrafted in the 2018 NBA draft, Bryant joined the Philadelphia 76ers for the 2018 NBA Summer League. 

On August 30, 2018, Bryant started his professional career with Hapoel Eilat of the Israeli Premier League, signing a one-year deal. On October 29, 2018, Bryant recorded a season-high 31 points, shooting 11-of-20 from the field, along with seven rebounds in an 81–75 win over Bnei Herzliya. On December 4, 2018, Bryant was named Israeli League Player of the Month after averaging 20.5 points, 8.3 rebounds and 2 steals in four games played in November. Bryant helped Eilat reach the 2019 Israeli League Final Four, where they eventually lost to Maccabi Tel Aviv. In 36 games played for Eilat, he finished as the league fourth-leading scorer (17.5 points per game) and fourth in efficiency rating (19.4 per game). On June 6, 2019, Bryant earned a spot in the All-Israeli League First Team.

Maccabi Tel Aviv (2019–2021)
On July 1, 2019, Bryant joined the Milwaukee Bucks for the 2019 NBA Summer League, where he averaged 14.2 points, 4.0 rebounds and 3.2 assists per game.

On July 23, 2019, Bryant signed a two-year deal with Maccabi Tel Aviv. On February 5, 2020, Bryant recorded a EuroLeague career-high 21 points, while shooting 9-of-19 from the field, along with six rebounds and four assists, leading Maccabi to an 80–77 win over Khimki. On May 10, 2021, he left Maccabi.

Milwaukee Bucks (2021) 
On May 13, 2021, Bryant signed with the Milwaukee Bucks. In his first and only regular-season NBA game, Bryant scored 16 points against the Chicago Bulls on May 16, 2021, in the Bucks' season finale. Bryant won an NBA championship when the Bucks defeated the Phoenix Suns in 6 games of the 2021 NBA Finals. By playing 11 playoff games and only one regular season game in his career, Bryant has played in 10 more playoffs games in his career than he has regular season games. In those 11 playoff games he averaged 1.3 points 1.1 rebounds in 4.5 minutes per game. On September 26, he was waived by the Bucks, but was re-signed three days later. On October 14, the Bucks waived Bryant.

Anadolu Efes (2021–present) 
On October 18, 2021, Bryant signed with Anadolu Efes of the Basketbol Süper Ligi in Turkey.

Career statistics

NBA

|-
| style="text-align:left;background:#afe6ba;"|†
| style="text-align:left;"|Milwaukee
| 1 || 0 || 32.0 || .462 || .200 || 1.000 || 6.0 || 3.0 || .0 || 1.0 || 16.0
|- class="sortbottom"
| style="text-align:center;" colspan="2"|Career
| 1 || 0 || 32.0 || .462 || .200 || 1.000 || 6.0 || 3.0 || .0 || 1.0 || 16.0

Playoffs

|-
| style="text-align:left;background:#afe6ba;"|2021†
| style="text-align:left;"|Milwaukee
| 11 || 0 || 4.5 || .350	 || .000 || − || 1.1 || .4 || .2 || .1 || 1.3
|- class="sortbottom"
| style="text-align:center;" colspan="2"|Career
| 11 || 0 || 4.5 || .350 || .000 || − || 1.1 || .4 || .2 || .1 || 1.3
|- class="sortbottom"

College

|-
| style="text-align:left;"| 2014–15
| style="text-align:left;"| Elon
| 33 || 13 || 25.5 || .382 || .349 || .751 || 4.2 || 2.7 || 1.3 || .4 || 14.2
|-
| style="text-align:left;"| 2016–17
| style="text-align:left;"| BYU
| 23 || 9 || 24.7 || .426 || .278 || .796 || 3.6 || 2.2 || .9 || .3 || 11.7
|-
| style="text-align:left;"| 2017–18
| style="text-align:left;"| BYU
| 35 || 34 || 34.7 || .494 || .415 || .850 || 6.3 || 2.3 || 1.3 || .5 || 18.2
|- class="sortbottom"
| style="text-align:center;" colspan="2"| Career
| 91 || 56 || 28.8 || .437 || .366 || .800 || 4.9 || 2.4 || 1.2 || .4 || 15.1

Personal life
Bryant is the son of Israel Bryant and Reginald Strother, a physician. He is a member of the Church of Jesus Christ of Latter-day Saints. He married Jenelle Fraga in August 2017. They have one son.

References

External links
 BYU bio
 RealGM profile
 TBLStat.net Profile

1995 births
Living people
American expatriate basketball people in Israel
American men's basketball players
Anadolu Efes S.K. players
Basketball players from Georgia (U.S. state)
BYU Cougars men's basketball players
Elon Phoenix men's basketball players
Hapoel Eilat basketball players
Latter Day Saints from Georgia (U.S. state)
Maccabi Tel Aviv B.C. players
Milwaukee Bucks players
People from Gwinnett County, Georgia
Shooting guards
Sportspeople from the Atlanta metropolitan area
Undrafted National Basketball Association players
New Hampton School alumni